Soriyankuppam is a village in Bahour Commune of Bahour taluk  in the Union Territory of Puducherry, India. Soriyankuppam serves as a bypass for Puducherry - Panruti route via Savadi. It lies on southern tip of Bahour Enclave of Puducherry district.

Geography
Soriyankuppam is bordered by Irandairavilagam village of Tamil nadu in the west, Kuruvinatham in the north, Parikkalpattu in the east and Pennaiyar River in the south.

Road Network
Soriyankuppam  is connected to Bahour, its Commune Headquarters via Kuruvinatham road. Cuddalore-Pallinelliyanur Major District Road (MDR) passes through Soriyankuppam. Soriyankuppam is directly connected to Puducherry by Puducherry - Soriyankuppam Bus route.

Gallery

Politics
Soriyankuppam is  a part of Bahour (Union Territory Assembly constituency) which comes under Puducherry (Lok Sabha constituency)

References

External links
Official website of the Government of the Union Territory of Puducherry

Villages in Puducherry district